Katri Kalpala (born September 29, 1976 in Helsinki) is a Finnish rhythmic gymnast.

Kalpala competed for Finland in the rhythmic gymnastics individual all-around competition at the 1996 Summer Olympics in Atlanta. There she was 34th in the qualification round and did not advance to the semifinal.

Family 
Her father is businessman Asmo Kalpala (fi).

References

External links 
 
 

1976 births
Living people
Finnish rhythmic gymnasts
Gymnasts at the 1996 Summer Olympics
Olympic gymnasts of Finland
Sportspeople from Helsinki